Naldi is an Italian surname. Notable people with the surname include:

 Giuseppe Naldi (1770–1821), Italian operatic tenor
 Neda Naldi (1913–1993), Italian theatrical
 Nita Naldi (1894–1961), American silent film actress
 Ronald Naldi, American lyric tenor

Italian-language surnames